Bangladesh Council of Scientific and Industrial Research (BCSIR) is a scientific research organization and regulatory body of Bangladesh. Its main objective is to pursue scientific research for the betterment of the Bangladeshi people. It was established on 16 November 1973.

History
BCSIR traces its roots back to the days of East Pakistan. East Regional Laboratories of Pakistan Council of Scientific and Industrial Research (PCSIR) was established in Dhaka in 1955. Subsequently, PSCIR laboratories were established in Rajshahi (1965) and in Chittagong (1967). After the independence of Bangladesh in 1971, BCSIR was established by a resolution of the Government of the People's Republic of Bangladesh which subsequently was reconstituted as the Bangladesh Council of Scientific and Industrial Research through a Presidential Ordinance namely Ordinance No. (V) of 1978.

Gallery

References

External links
 

Science and technology in Bangladesh
Bangladeshi research organisations
Learned societies of Bangladesh
Think tanks based in Bangladesh
Research institutes in Bangladesh
Government agencies of Bangladesh
1973 establishments in Bangladesh
Organisations based in Dhaka